The molecular formula C19H26N4O2 may refer to:

 BIMU8, a drug which acts as a 5-HT4 receptor selective agonist
 Sucrononic acid, a guanidino derivative artificial sweetener

Molecular formulas